Mansonia dyari is a species of mosquito in the family Culicidae.

References

dyari
Articles created by Qbugbot
Insects described in 1970